Stephen Turnbull (born 7 January 1987)  is an English footballer who last played for Blyth Spartans. He is the twin brother of fellow midfielder Phil Turnbull.

Turnbull is a central midfield player. He captained the Hartlepool youth team during the Dallas Cup in 2005 where they achieved third place, and made 22 appearances for the first team the following season, earning his first professional contract.

He joined Bury on loan in 2006, where he was picked by manager Chris Casper for their 3–1 FA Cup second round replay win at Chester City on 12 December; he was ineligible to play and Bury were therefore thrown out of the tournament. Danny Wilson recalled Turnbull to Hartlepool soon after this. He spent March 2007 on loan at Rochdale, playing in four matches.

After leaving Hartlepool at the end of the 2007–08 season, he signed for Gateshead on 2 June 2008, teaming up with his brother. He was released by Gateshead on 14 May 2009 and signed for neighbours Blyth Spartans. Whilst at the club he was awarded the 2010–11 Supporters Player of the year award.

In May 2011 he joined Harrogate Town, but left in February 2012 to move to Australia.

In February 2013, Turnbull returned to England and rejoined Blyth Spartans. He played part-time and worked in the engine room of a cruise ship. He then left Spartans to join Shildon at the end of the 2013–14 season. In September 2014, he started his third spell at Blyth. In the 2014–15 season, he scored seven goals for the Spartans, one of them the famous free-kick at Hartlepool United in the second round of the FA Cup. He helped Blyth get to the third round proper as well as win the Northumberland Senior Cup. As of 22 August he has played a total of 150 appearances in three spells at Blyth Spartans. He announced on 1 February 2017, that he'd be ending his playing career to work full-time on the cruise-liner. He stated that, while he'd be back in England from "time-to-time", it was "largely the end" of his playing career.

References

External links
Profile at Blyth Spartans A.F.C.
Profile at Hartlepool United F.C.
Profile at In The Mad Crowd

1987 births
Living people
Footballers from South Shields
English footballers
Association football midfielders
Hartlepool United F.C. players
Gateshead F.C. players
Bury F.C. players
Rochdale A.F.C. players
Blyth Spartans A.F.C. players
Harrogate Town A.F.C. players
Shildon A.F.C. players
English Football League players
National League (English football) players
Northern Premier League players
Twin sportspeople
English twins